Look is an art magazine published by the Art Gallery Society of New South Wales in Australia since October 1985. The magazine is delivered to the members of the art gallery and was previously published on a monthly basis. Its frequency switched to bimonthly. The magazine is headquartered in Sydney.

References

External links
Art Gallery of New South Wales

1985 establishments in Australia
Arts magazines published in Australia
Monthly magazines published in Australia
Magazines established in 1985
Bi-monthly magazines published in Australia
Magazines published in Sydney